Mahadi Sinambela (died 1 March 2019) was an Indonesian politician who served as Minister of Youth and Sports Affairs.

References

Date of birth missing
2019 deaths
Indonesian politicians
People of Batak descent